Adela was a brig built in 1862 by John Chevalier Cobbold.It was named after Adela Harriette Dupuis who had married his son John Patteson Cobbold in 1858.

References

Ships built in Ipswich
Brigs